Sagufta Yasmin Emily (born 3 November 1962) is a Bangladesh Awami League politician and a member of parliament from the Munshiganj-2 constituency. She served as a whip of the parliament in the 9th National Parliament (2009-2013).

Education
Emily completed her bachelor's and master's degree in geography from the University of Dhaka in 1984 and 1986 respectively.

Career
Emily was elected to parliament from Munshiganj District in January 2009 as a candidate of Bangladesh Awami League.

Emily was reelected to the parliament in January 2014. On 8 March 2010 at a roundtable organized by Transparency International Bangladesh, she described the religiously motivated terrorism as an obstacle for the advancement for women in Bangladesh. At the Padma Bridge—New Lifeline of Development organized by BSRM and The Daily Star on 10 January 2016, where she talked about the effects of river erosion in her constituency. She told the panel how the local government had to use millions of takas worth of sandbags to prevent erosion. In July 2016 she accused some Non-Government Organisations of being involved with activities against the state and called for the government to take action against them. State Minister for Social Welfare Nuruzzaman Ahmed said the government will monitor their activities and that the government was willing to take "drastic action" if the situation demands it.

References

Living people
1962 births
People from Munshiganj District
Awami League politicians
Women members of the Jatiya Sangsad
21st-century Bangladeshi women politicians
9th Jatiya Sangsad members
10th Jatiya Sangsad members
11th Jatiya Sangsad members
Place of birth missing (living people)
20th-century Bangladeshi women politicians